Nellis Tavern is a historic inn and tavern located at St. Johnsville in Montgomery County, New York. It was built about 1747-1750 as a farmhouse and expanded about 1790 to its present form.  It is a two-story, five-by-two-bay frame residence constructed atop a coursed rubblestone foundation. The building has been restored to the period of about 1835, when it was used as a tavern.

After the American Civil War the tavern business declined and the building was used again as a family farmhouse.

It was added to the National Register of Historic Places in 1990.

An herb garden has been established on the grounds, and there is an associated yearly Rhubarb Festival.

References

External links
Palatine Settlement Society, Inc.: Nellis Tavern
Three Rivers: Hudson~Mohawk~Schoharie, History From America's Most Famous Valleys, Nellis Tavern

Houses on the National Register of Historic Places in New York (state)
Federal architecture in New York (state)
Houses completed in 1750
Houses in Montgomery County, New York
Museums in Montgomery County, New York
Historic house museums in New York (state)
National Register of Historic Places in Montgomery County, New York
1750 establishments in the Province of New York